The Rolla Daily News was a daily newspaper published in Rolla, Missouri, United States until October 2021. It was owned by Gannett.

The paper covered Rolla and Phelps County, Missouri, including the city of Newburg. It traced its history back to several Rolla newspapers that date back to the 1870s. Madeleine Albright worked as a reporter there in the 1950s.

It was noted for its coverage of the development of Rolla as a town, with a dedicated "Progress Edition" having been published annually during the town's growth in the 1940s and 1950s.

The paper was the site of legal notices regarding the environmental impact of the Route 63 Corridor Project.

The Rolla Daily News was printed at the presses of its sister paper in nearby Pulaski County, The Daily Guide, as was the St. James Leader-Journal, in the Phelps County city of St. James.

References

External links 
 

Gannett publications
Newspapers published in Missouri
Phelps County, Missouri